Lucilia pilosiventris belongs to the family Calliphoridae, the species most commonly referred to as the blowflies, and the genus Lucilia.

References

Calliphoridae
Diptera of Europe
Insects described in 1910